I magi randagi, internationally released as We Free Kings, is a 1996 Italian comedy film directed by Sergio Citti.

The film won the Silver Ribbon for Best Original Story.

Plot summary 

Three amateur actors in theater are chased away by their performance, because the satirically subject from their complaint treats in a controversial manner the cruelty of the Nazis. The three actors take refuge in a rural country where they, having the bright idea to recite a sacred drama on the birth of Jesus Christ, have to interpret the three Biblical Magi. The show is so successful and magically the villagers give birth to a son on Christmas Eve for every family, and there the faith in Jesus is regained.

Cast 

Silvio Orlando: Melchiorre 
Rolf Zacher:  "Augusto"/ Gaspare
Patrick Bauchau:   Baldassarre 
Gastone Moschin: Don Gregorio 
Laura Betti: Chorus girl
Franco Citti: Attore
Ninetto Davoli: Comparsa

Critical reception

In Time Out New York, Andrew Johnston (critic) wrote: "Warm performances from its lead troika and beautiful photography of the Italian countryside help compensate for the film's fairly flimsy nature. ... The humor is low-key but relatively consistent, and the three leads make a good comedy team."

See also
 List of Christmas films

References

External links

1996 films
1990s Christmas comedy films
Films directed by Sergio Citti
Films scored by Ennio Morricone
Italian Christmas comedy films
1990s Italian-language films
1990s Italian films